Saúl del Cerro García (born 20 May 2004) is a Spanish footballer who plays as a midfielder for Burgos CF Promesas.

Club career
Born in Burgos, Castile and León, del Cerro was a Burgos CF youth graduate. On 23 October 2021, aged just 17, he made his senior debut with the reserves by coming on as a second-half substitute in a 0–3 Segunda División RFEF home loss against UD Logroñés B.

Del Cerro made his first-team debut on 14 December 2021, replacing fellow debutant Iván Serrano late into a 0–2 away loss against Real Zaragoza in the season's Copa del Rey.

References

External links

2004 births
Living people
Sportspeople from Burgos
Spanish footballers
Footballers from Castile and León
Association football midfielders
Segunda Federación players
Burgos CF Promesas players
Burgos CF footballers